Abimbola Alale is a Nigerian Satellite Technologist. In 2016, she was appointed as the chief executive officer for Nigerian Communications Satellite Limited by Goodluck Jonathan, former president of Nigeria. She was re-appointed in 2019 for another 4 years term in office by President Muhammadu Buhari. As of 2016, she stood as the first and only female CEO of a major satellite company in Africa, Europe, and the Middle East. She holds a postgraduate degree in Space Studies and an MBA degree from the International Space University, Strasbourg, France. Alale has her Ph.D. program in Peace, Security and Strategic Studies from Nasarawa State University. She is a mother of 10 children, 9 of them are adopted. In 2021, Reset Global People called her one of Africas 100 Women CEOs.

Education and Career 
Abimbola holds a postgraduate degree in Space Studies and an MBA degree from the International Space University, Strasbourg, France. She had her Ph.D. program in Peace, Security and Strategic Studies from Nassarawa State Universities. Alale holds a certificate in Technology Innovation and Leadership at the Massachusetts Institute of Technology, Boston, USA. She attended another certification at the World Financial Public Relations and Marketing Business School at the Management School, London.

Until she became the M/D and CEO of NIGCOMSAT, she was the executive director, Marketing of the company. n 2015, she replaced Engineer Ahmed Timasaniyu. as the chief executive officer of Nigerian Communications Satellite. She served as a member of Advisory Board Members to the Space Generation Council (SGAC), 2018–2019. The advisory board was designed to provide strategic direction and advice to SGAC. She has contributed to many national projects such as he NigComSat-1, NigComSat-1R projects and the establishment of a National Direct-to-Home Digital Transmission Centre. In 20

References 

Living people
Nigerian chief executives
Year of birth missing (living people)
Yoruba businesspeople